Paul Malékou (born November 17, 1938) was the Foreign Minister of Gabon for a period in 1968. He was born in Fougamou, Gabon.

Malékou was Director-General of ASECNA from 1975 to 1983.

References

1938 births
Living people
Foreign ministers of Gabon
People from Ngounié Province
21st-century Gabonese people